Adelina Santos-Rodriguez  (August 6, 1920 – September 30, 2021) was a Filipina politician and civil leader who served as the first woman Mayor of Quezon City from 1976 to 1986. She also distinguished herself in charity work especially her programs for the Philippine Red Cross. She was married to Isidro Rodriguez, a softball official and former Governor of Rizal.

She completed her primary education at Assumption Convent at Herran, Manila and high school education at the College of the Holy Ghost in Manila. She then attended University of Santo Tomas, where she was proclaimed "Miss Education" and completed her Bachelor of Science in Home Economics degree. In the 1960s, Rodriguez was active in the post-war relocation projects of the People’s Homesite and Housing Corporation in Quezon City.

She was appointed by President Ferdinand Marcos as mayor of Quezon City, following the resignation of Norberto S. Amoranto. She focused on healthcare (by establishing health centers across the city and promoting family planning and birth control), tourism, and culture. She also established an economic development council to invite more businesses, jobs, investments, and livelihood in the city. It was also during her term when the Quezon Memorial Shrine was inaugurated. She was conferred as the city’s Tandang Sora awardee in 2016. After stepping down from office, she served as officer and head of different civic organizations and women's organizations.

See also
 Mayor of Quezon City
 Isidro Rodriguez
 Ramon Magsaysay (Cubao) High School

References

1920 births
2021 deaths
Beauty queen-politicians
Mayors of Quezon City
University of Santo Tomas alumni
Women mayors of places in the Philippines
Filipino feminists
Filipino centenarians
Women centenarians
20th-century Filipino politicians
20th-century Filipino women politicians